The FC Valdepenas a Puertollano was a Spanish  gauge narrow gauge railway that operated between Valdepenas and Puertollano. Locomotives included 9 steam locomotives of 0-8-0 and 0-6-0 types manufactured by Couillet, Arnold Jung and Orenstein & Koppel, and one diesel locomotive made by Metalúrgica S. Martin. There were also 17 passenger cars and 160 freight cars.

See also 
 Narrow gauge railways in Spain

References 

750 mm gauge railways in Spain
Transport in Castilla–La Mancha
Companies based in Castilla–La Mancha
Defunct companies of Spain